Hans Mehlhorn (January 16, 1900 - July 2, 1983) was a German bobsledder who competed in the early 1930s. He won the bronze medal in the four-man event at the 1932 Winter Olympics in Lake Placid.

References
Bobsleigh four-man Olympic medalists for 1924, 1932-56, and since 1964
DatabaseOlympics.com profile

1900 births
1983 deaths
German male bobsledders
Olympic bobsledders of Germany
Bobsledders at the 1932 Winter Olympics
Olympic bronze medalists for Germany
Olympic medalists in bobsleigh
Medalists at the 1932 Winter Olympics